The climate of Serbia is between a continental climate in the north, with cold dry winters, and warm, humid summers with well distributed rainfall patterns, and a  more Mediterranean climate  in the south with hot, dry summers and autumns and average relatively cool and more rainy winters with heavy mountain snowfall. Differences in elevation, proximity to the Adriatic Sea and Aegean Sea and large river basins, as well as exposure to the winds account for climate differences.

Most of Northern Serbia possesses a typical continental climate, with air masses from northern and western Europe which shape its climatic profile. South and South-east of Serbia is subject to strong Mediterranean influences (hotter summers and milder winters). However, the Dinaric Alps and other mountain ranges contribute to the cooling down a large part   of the warm air masses. Winters are quite harsh in Raška (region) because of the mountains which encircle the plateau. One of the climatic features of Serbia is Košava, a cold and very squally southeastern wind which starts in the Carpathian Mountains and follows the Danube northwest through the Iron Gate where it gains a jet effect and continues to Belgrade and can spread as far south as Niš. Mediterranean micro-regions exist throughout southern Serbia, in Zlatibor and the Pčinja District around valley and river Pčinja.

Extreme weather and records
Serbia is one of few European countries with a very high risk exposure to natural hazards (earthquakes, storms, floods and droughts). It is estimated that potential floods, particularly in areas of Central Serbia, threaten over 500 larger settlements and an area of 16,000 square kilometres. The most disastrous were the floods in May 2014, when 57 people died and a damage of over 1.5 billion euros was inflicted.

Examples

References

 
Serbia